Sar Asiab-e Bala (also Romanized as Sar Āsīāb-e Bālā; also known as Sar Āsīāb) is a village in Javid-e Mahuri Rural District, in the Central District of Mamasani County, Fars Province, Iran. At the 2006 census, its population was 502, in 104 families.

References 

Populated places in Mamasani County